In June 2006, the Wales national rugby union team travelled to Argentina for a two-test series against the Argentina national team. The first test was playedon 11 June in Puerto Madryn, a city in the heart of the former Welsh colony in Patagonia, founded by Welsh settlers in 1865. The second test was played in Buenos Aires a week later. They were Wales' first matches under the management of new head coach Gareth Jenkins, who had been appointed to replace Mike Ruddock in April 2006. The test series was thrown into doubt earlier in the year after 60 Argentine players threatened to retire from international duty due to a dispute with the Argentine Rugby Union (UAR), but this was resolved at the end of May 2006.

Background
This was Wales' fourth tour to Argentina, and the third for which they awarded caps. The first tour took place in 1968, when Argentina won the first match and drew the second. Wales won both matches in the first capped series in 1999, while the two sides won a test each in 2004.

Squad
The first test was coach Gareth Jenkins' first in charge of Wales, having been appointed to the role six weeks earlier following the resignation of 2005 Grand Slam-winning coach Mike Ruddock. Jenkins named a 28-man squad for the tour on 10 May 2006. Several senior players were left out due to injury or to allow them a period of rest after the British & Irish Lions tour to New Zealand the previous summer and ahead of the 2007 Rugby World Cup the following year. Ospreys prop Duncan Jones was named as captain for the tour. Five uncapped players – Ian Evans, Richard Hibbard, James Hook, Alun Wyn Jones and Rhys M. Thomas – were included in the squad.

Ospreys centre Gavin Henson was the first to withdraw from the original squad due to fitness concerns. Although Jenkins initially said that a specialist inside centre would be called up to replace Henson, Nathan Brew of the Dragons was called up two weeks later to fill the vacant berth. Prop Gethin Jenkins and back row Dafydd Jones both withdrew with shoulder injuries before the end of May, replaced by Blues prop John Yapp and Dragons flanker Jamie Ringer respectively. Centre Hal Luscombe was the final withdrawal, having suffered a rib injury in the Dragons' Heineken Cup play-off against Overmach Parma, and replaced by Blues utility back Nick Macleod.

Results

First test
The first test was played in Puerto Madryn, a city founded by Welsh settlers in Patagonia in 1865. Despite the large Welsh-speaking population in the area, this was the Wales national team's first visit there.

Ian Evans and Alun Wyn Jones started the match to earn their first caps for Wales, while Richard Hibbard and James Hook came off the bench. Evans scored a 45-metre interception try to put Wales in front after Juan Martín Fernández Lobbe had cancelled out Mark Jones' third-minute opening score, but José María Núñez Piossek's try and a pair of penalties from Federico Todeschini meant the home side took a 20–12 lead into half-time, helped by the sin-binnings of Wales back row forwards Gavin Thomas and Alix Popham. Two penalties from Nicky Robinson reduced the margin to two points, but Francisco Leonelli put Argentina 27–18 up with three minutes of the game to go. Hook scored a try in injury time, converted by Robinson, but it proved mere consolation.

Second test
The second test was played in Buenos Aires and Argentina won more easily.

References

Wales in Argentina
Tour
2006 Argentina
Wales Tour
Wales 2006
2006